Stasiak is a Polish surname of patronymic origin. It is derived from the personal name "Stasio", a pet form of the name "Stanisław", and the suffix "-ak", denoting "descendant of". So, the surname Stasiak signifies "son or descendant of Stasio (Stanisław)".

Notable people with this surname include:
 Jurek Stasiak, Polish-Australian tennis player
 Ludwik Stasiak, Polish painter, writer and publisher
 Małgorzata Stasiak, Polish handball player
 Michał Stasiak, Polish football player
 Shawn Stasiak, Canadian chiropractor and semi-retired professional wrestler
 Stan Stasiak, former Canadian professional wrestler, father of professional wrestler Shawn Stasiak
 Władysław Stasiak, Polish politician

Polish-language surnames
Patronymic surnames